Jean-Baptiste Delestre was a French artist and writer upon art. His painting "Scene during the eruption of Vesuvius" is displayed in the Museum of Nantes.

Early life and career
Delestre was born at Lyons in 1800. He was a pupil of Gros, and he also studied water-colour painting and sculpture; after a time, he abandoned the practice of art, and devoted himself to history and criticism.

Paul-Èdouard Delabrièrre studied painting under Delestre before eventually turning to sculpture.

Politics
He was a radical in politics, and took an active part in the French Revolution of 1848. His painting "Scene during the eruption of Vesuvius" is displayed in the Museum of Nantes. His principal writings were "Études progressives des têtes du Cénacle peint a Milan par Leonard de Vinci" (1827) and "Gros et ses ouvrages" (1867).

Death
He died in Paris in 1871.

References

Notes

External links
 

1800 births
1871 deaths
19th-century French painters
French male painters
French art historians
Pupils of Antoine-Jean Gros
Artists from Lyon
French male non-fiction writers
Writers from Lyon
19th-century French male artists